Joanna Rubin Dranger (born March 1, 1970, in Stockholm as Anna Joanna Dranger) is a Swedish author, cartoonist, children's book's artist and illustrator best known for her graphic novels Miss Scaredy-Cat and Love and Miss Remarkable and Her Career.

Rubin Dranger is a professor in illustration at the Department of Design, Craft and Arts of the University College of Arts, Crafts and Design (Konstfack) in Stockholm, where she shares responsibility for the MA programme in Visual Communication.

Bibliography

Graphic novels
 Fröken Livrädd & Kärleken (1999)
Fröken Märkvärdig & Karriären (2001; English translation by Maura Tavares: Miss Remarkable and Her Career, 2003)
Askungens Syster Och Andra Sedelärande Berättelser (2005)
Alltid Redo Att Dö För Mitt Barn (2008)
What doesn't kill you makes you stronger (2008)

Children's books
 ARG! Nittiotalets argaste bok with Anna Karin Cullberg (1989)
 LEDSEN! En helt vanlig historia with Anna Karin Cullberg (1992)
 Johannabarnet, illustrated book written by Victoria Hammar (2003)
 ARG! Tvåtusentalets argaste bok, with Anna Karin Cullberg (2004)
 Dag Drömlund, dagdrömmare, with Anders Brundin (2004)
 GLAD! (2007)
 Räkna med Nell (2009)
 Nell leker inne (2009)
 Nell på våren (2010)
 Nell på sommaren (2010)
 Nell på hösten (2010)
 Nell på vintern (2010)

Other
 Fittflickan, satirical feminist superhero parody published by the newspaper Aftonbladet (1999)
 Stamps, Fröken Livrädd & Kärleken, Svenska Posten (2002)

References

External links 
Official website
Porträtt hos Albert Bonniers Förlag

1970 births
Living people
20th-century Swedish women artists
21st-century Swedish women artists
20th-century Swedish women writers
21st-century Swedish women writers
Swedish cartoonists
Swedish women cartoonists
Swedish children's book illustrators
Swedish illustrators
Swedish women illustrators
Writers from Stockholm
Sommar (radio program) hosts
Academic staff of Konstfack
Swedish women academics